Peirce is an English surname. Notable people with this surname include:

 Augustus Baker Peirce (1840–1919) American traveler; riverboat captain and artist in Australia
 Benjamin Peirce (1809–1880), American mathematician, known for Peirce's Criterion, father of Charles
 Charles Sanders Peirce (C. S. Peirce) (1839–1914), American philosopher, founder of pragmatism
 Clarence V. Peirce (1850–1923), American farmer and politician
 Cyrus Peirce (1790–1860), American educator, Unitarian minister
 Ebenezer W. Peirce (1822–1902), American brigadier general (Union) in the Civil War. 
 Gareth Peirce (born c. 1940), British solicitor, known for human rights cases
 George James Peirce (1868–1954), American botanist
 Hayford Peirce (1942–2020), American writer of science fiction, mysteries, and spy thrillers
 Joseph Peirce (1748–1812), U.S. Representative from New Hampshire
 Juliette Peirce (died 1934), second wife of the mathematician and philosopher Charles Peirce
 Henry A. Peirce (1808–1885) of Massachusetts. U.S. Minister to Hawaiian Islands
 Kimberly Peirce (born 1967), American film director
 Leslie P. Peirce, American historian
 Lincoln Peirce, American cartoonist known for the comic strip Big Nate
 Robert B. F. Peirce (1843–1898) U.S. Representative from Indiana
 Victor Peirce (1958–2002), Australian criminal from Melbourne
 Waldo Peirce (1884–1970), American painter, born in Bangor, Maine
Robert Peirce (engineer) (1863–1933), Municipal Water Engineer, Penang and Singapore

See also 
 Pierce (surname)
 Peirce (given name)

Surnames from given names